Banksia is a suburb in southern Sydney, in the state of New South Wales, Australia. Banksia is located 12 kilometres south of the Sydney central business district, in the local government area of the Bayside Council and is part of the St George area.

History
Banksia is named for Joseph Banks, a botanist on the Voyage of Discovery of James Cook which visited the nearby Botany Bay in 1770.

The suburb was part of land owned by Simeon Pearce (1821–86) and his brother James Pearce in the 1850s, which extended from Rockdale to Brighton-Le-Sands. Until the late nineteenth century, the area was heavily timbered but residential development began in the 1880s. One of the leading developers was Frederick Jamison Gibbes, a Member of Parliament, after whom Gibbes Street in the suburb is named. The area developed more rapidly after the railway station opened on 21 October 1906. Many names for the suburb were suggested but the final choice came from David George Stead, father of novelist Christina Stead. The post office opened in August 1924.

Heritage listings 
Banksia has a number of heritage-listed sites, including:
 212 West Botany Street: Arncliffe Market Gardens

Landmarks
 Banksia Hotel
 National Film and Sound Archive
 Rocksia Hotel
 St Savvas of Kalymnos Orthodox Church (formerly Banksia Free Church)

Commercial area

Banksia is mainly residential with a few commercial developments. It features mostly low density houses and some medium density blocks of flats. Banksia shopping centre consists of a small group of shops on Railway Street beside Banksia railway station. It includes Banksia Bakery, a take-away shop, a convenience store, chemist, Australia Post and a number of hairdressers.

More shops and commercial developments are located on the Princes Highway. This commercial area extends to the adjacent suburbs of Arncliffe and Rockdale. Many of the commercial developments are part of an automotive precinct featuring car yards, auto accessory retailers, tyre shops and auto repairers, other businesses include hotels and various take away food shops.
 	
A market garden is located on the eastern side of West Botany Street, close to St George Soccer Stadium. Located next to St George Stadium on the grounds of Barton Park lies the Rockdale Ilinden Sports Centre, the former home grounds of the Rockdale Ilinden Football Club, a largely Macedonian supported NSWPL soccer club.

Transport
Banksia railway station on the Eastern Suburbs & Illawarra Line of the Sydney Trains network. Banksia is also serviced by Transit Systems route 420 that runs between Burwood and Eastgardens via Sydney Airport.

Population
According to the 2016 census, there were 3,388 residents in Banksia. 49.9% of people were born in Australia. The next most common countries of birth were Macedonia 7.0% and China 4.6%. 42.4% of people only spoke English at home. Other languages spoken at home included Macedonian 10.8%, Arabic 5.9%, Cantonese 5.2%, Greek 4.8% and Mandarin 3.1%. The most common responses for religion were Catholic 23.8%, No Religion 18.2% and Eastern Orthodox 16.5%.

Houses

References

External links
 St George Soccer Stadium

Suburbs of Sydney
Bayside Council